Edinaldo Batista Libânio (born 2 April 1979), commonly known as Grafite (pronounced ), is a Brazilian former professional footballer who played as a striker. He currently works as a pundit for TV Globo and SporTV.

In 2005, Grafite won the Copa Libertadores and the Club World Championship with São Paulo FC. With German club VfL Wolfsburg he won the 2008–09 Bundesliga, and was the league's top scorer as well as Germany's Player of the Year.

Club career

Beginnings 
Born in Jundiaí, Edinaldo Libânio grew up in modest circumstances in the hinterland of the State of São Paulo. He made his first money with the door to door sales of rubbish bags. His talent as football player however earned him his first professional contract in 1999 with the Matão based club SE Matonense with which he played in the first division of the State Championship. In the beginning of 2000 he moved from there for a brief period to the fourth division club Ferroviária in the neighboring town of Araraquara – a club that actually had seen some quite gifted players in its teams in better seasons.

In the middle of the year he signed on with the first division club Santa Cruz FC of the north-eastern Brazilian city Recife. There he scored 5 goals in 22 league matches, which did not aid in preventing relegation to Série B.

However, he attracted the attention of Grêmio Porto Alegre, another first division club, which hired him for a transfer fee of one million Real – of this sum Santa Cruz had to forward about 700,000 real to Matonense.

Luck was not with him in Porto Alegre. Right at the beginning of the year he incurred a severe knee injury, which saw him sidelined for several months. In July 2002, at one of his first matches for the Rio Grande do Sul club the team was eliminated by Paraguay's Club Olimpia in the semi-finals of the Libertadores. He played six more Série A matches for Grêmio, without scoring, before being returned in September to Santa Cruz on a loan.

With his old club he failed in the Série B semifinals against Criciúma EC to attain promotion to the national top flight. Altogether he scored three second division goals for the Recife club in this phase.

Right at the beginning of 2003 Grafite was forwarded to the FC Seoul of the South Korean K League, then known as Anyang LG Cheetahs. This remained a brief, undistinguished stint and both, player and club, were happy to part ways by mid-year.

Success with Goiás and São Paulo 
Back in Brazil Grafite joined first division club Goiás EC in the city of Goiânia. This move soon led to legal differences as to who owned the rights to the player, where Grêmio made claims. Another matter in the case were outstanding wage payments by Santa Cruz FC until the end of the previous year. Matters found a resolution in the best interest of Grafite and his new club.

Grafite considered the time in the capital of the state of Goiás as his "rebirth as a footballer". In the course of the season he developed together with Dimba, who became the league's top scorer with 31 goals, and
Araújo, who, like Grafite, hit the goal 12 times, into the outstanding attack formation of the club's history. Goiás finished the season ninth, which was considered a success for the club from Brazil's central-west. Grafite himself was awarded with a Bola de Prata as best player on his position over the season.

At the beginning of 2004 Grafite was signed by Brazilian top-side São Paulo FC, where he won the 2005 São Paulo State Championship, his first title.

In the same month Grafite made it worldwide into the headlines. In the Libertadores group match against the Argentine club Quilmes AC in the Morumbi Stadium he had a hefty encounter with defender Leandro Desábato whom he accused of racial slurs. Together with the Argentine midfielder Carlos Arano, who tried to intervene, he was sent off. Still during the match, Grafite reported the incident to the police, which arrested Desábato after the final whistle on his way to the locker room for racial insults and moved him to a police station for a further interview. After two days in police arrest Desábato was released against a bond and was allowed to return to Argentina.

Another exciting event for Grafite in this month was an invitation by the coach of the Brazil national football team, Carlos Alberto Parreira to join the Seleção for the first time when it lined up for a friendly against Guatemala on 27 April in São Paulo's Pacaembu Stadium. Grafite contributed with one goal to the 3–0 score.

Until the end of the year Grafite could collect two more titles, winning the Copa Libertadores and the Club World Championship. Whilst he was not in the line-ups of any of the two Libertadores finals against Atlético Paranaense, he played in the last 15 minutes of the Club World Championship final in November in Tokyo against Liverpool, which São Paulo won 1–0.

Move to Europe 
In January 2006 French club Le Mans UC 72, promoted to the first division in 2005, hired the Brazilian striker. Grafite debuted in February, and until the end of the season he had scored three times in eleven league matches. 2006–07 he was in the league line-up of MUC in 34 of 38 matches and scored 12 goals, which made him the top goal-getter of the club – which finished the season 12th – and third in France over all. At the beginning of the 2007–08 season he played six more league matches for Le Mans, scoring a further two goals, before being transferred to German Bundesliga club VfL Wolfsburg on 31 August, the last day of the transfer period, for a fee of about €5.6 million.

VfL Wolfsburg 

With Wolfsburg he signed a four-year contract, which he extended in 2009 until 2012. In his first season, he scored 11 times in 24 matches, and was also his team's top scorer. At the end of the following season the Felix Magath-managed Wolves were champions of Germany for the first time, and Grafite contributed with 28 goals in 25 matches, making him the league's top striker. Alongside his partner in the attack, Edin Džeko, who scored 26 goals, he formed the most prolific strike partnership in Bundesliga history, together totalling 54 goals, topping the achievements of Gerd Müller and Uli Hoeneß, who scored 53 goals in the 1971–72 season.

One of the goals of Wolfsburg's 5–1 against FC Bayern Munich, when he dribbled past several defenders and then finished with a slow shot with his heel, even brought him international attention. In Germany it was voted Goal of the Year. In October 2009, FIFA announced the introduction of the FIFA Puskás Award, awarded to the player who has scored the "most beautiful goal" over the past year. The inaugural Puskás Award went to Cristiano Ronaldo and Grafite's effort was rated third. Grafite, however, was rewarded with the highest individual honour German football has to bestow, and was voted Footballer of the Year, and became only the third foreigner to achieve this.

By ESPN Brasil he also received the Prêmio Futebol no Mundo award as the promising discovery of the 2008–09 season, as well as the top goalscorer award of the same season.

In Wolfsburg's first ever Champions League match against CSKA Moscow on 15 September 2009, Grafite scored a hat-trick to beat the Russian side 3–1 at the Volkswagen Arena in Wolfsburg, becoming only the sixth player to score a hat-trick on his Champions League debut. In 107 German top-flight matches Grafite he netted 59 times.

Al-Ahli Dubai
On 19 June 2011, Grafite announced he had signed with Al Ahli in the UAE Pro-League on a two-year contract.

Grafite was honored as the International Player of the Year for the 2012–13 UAE Pro-League on 26 May 2013, edging out top goalscorer Asamoah Gyan. On 28 May, he scored Al-Ahli's second goal in their 4–3 victory over Al Shabab Al Arabi in the final of the 2013 President's Cup.

Grafite scored a total of 63 goals in 79 matches for Al Ahli.

Santa Cruz
On 1 July 2015, Grafite was signed once again by Brazilian Série B club Santa Cruz, on a year-long contract. The club announced that he would wear shirt number 23. He arrived in the middle of the competition and scored 7 times in 15 matches, which helped promote Santa Cruz to the first division after 10 years without playing in it.

In August 2017, after a spell at Atlético Paranaense, he rejoined Santa Cruz.

In January 2018, Grafite announced his retirement.

International career 
On 2 March 2010, after almost five years since his debut for the national team, he made his second appearance, coming on as a substitution for Adriano in the game against Republic of Ireland at the Emirates Stadium in London. He was called up to the squad after Luís Fabiano was injured. On 11 May, Dunga named Grafite among his 23-man 2010 FIFA World Cup squad. Grafite made one appearance at the tournament, replacing Luís Fabiano for the last five minutes of the 0–0 draw with Portugal in the last Group match.

Career statistics

Club

State League

International 
Score and result list Brazil's goal tally first, score column indicates score after Grafite goal.

Honours 
São Paulo
 Copa Libertadores: 2005
 FIFA Club World Cup: 2005

VfL Wolfsburg
 Bundesliga: 2008–09

Al Ahli'
 UAE President's Cup: 2012–13
 UAE League: 2013–14
 UAE Super Cup: 2013
 UAE League Cup: 2011–12, 2013–14

Individual
 VDV Bundesliga Player of the Season: 2008–09
 kicker Bundesliga Team of the Season: 2008–09
 Goal of the Year (Germany): 2009
Footballer of the Year (Germany): 2009

References

External links 
 
 
 
 
 

1979 births
Living people
People from Jundiaí
Brazilian footballers
Association football forwards
Associação Ferroviária de Esportes players
Santa Cruz Futebol Clube players
Grêmio Foot-Ball Porto Alegrense players
FC Seoul players
Goiás Esporte Clube players
São Paulo FC players
Le Mans FC players
VfL Wolfsburg players
Al Ahli Club (Dubai) players
Al Sadd SC players
Club Athletico Paranaense players
Campeonato Brasileiro Série A players
Campeonato Brasileiro Série B players
K League 1 players
Ligue 1 players
UAE Pro League players
Bundesliga players
Qatar Stars League players
Brazil international footballers
2010 FIFA World Cup players
Brazilian expatriate footballers
Brazilian expatriate sportspeople in South Korea
Brazilian expatriate sportspeople in France
Brazilian expatriate sportspeople in Germany
Brazilian expatriate sportspeople in the United Arab Emirates
Brazilian expatriate sportspeople in Qatar
Expatriate footballers in South Korea
Expatriate footballers in France
Expatriate footballers in Germany
Expatriate footballers in the United Arab Emirates
Expatriate footballers in Qatar
Kicker-Torjägerkanone Award winners
Footballers from São Paulo (state)